Triantafyllos Tsapras (born 22 October 2001) is a Greek professional footballer who plays as a midfielder for Super League club Levadiakos.

Honours
Levadiakos
Super League 2: 2021–22

References

2001 births
Living people
Greek footballers
Super League Greece 2 players
Super League Greece players
Levadiakos F.C. players
Association football midfielders
Footballers from Livadeia